James Harden Hays (September 3, 1800 – March 30, 1876) was a pioneer of bituminous coal mining in Western Pennsylvania.  His first mine was opened in 1828, at the mouth of Street's Run, where it empties into the Monongahela River.  He died on March 30, 1876, at his home near Beck's Run.

References

Other sources
 

1876 deaths
1800 births
People from Allegheny County, Pennsylvania
American energy industry businesspeople
American businesspeople in the coal industry
Mining in Pennsylvania
Burials at Allegheny Cemetery
19th-century American businesspeople